Whitmore Hall is the home of the Cavenagh-Mainwaring family at Whitmore, Staffordshire.  A Grade I listed building, the hall was designated a house of outstanding architectural and historical interest and is a fine example of a small Carolean style manor house.

History
By the time of the Norman Conquest, the manor of Whitmore was held by one Richard the Forester. Whitmore appears in the Doomsday Book and is valued at 10 shillings.  By 1204 it was owned by William Boterel, who was described as "Dominus de Whitmore juxta Nova Castrum sub Lina" (Lord of Whitmore near Newcastle-under-Lyme).  The estate passed to the Mainwaring family in 1519, through the descendants of a Boterel heiress, Alice Boghay.  Their descendants have owned the estate ever since.  The Mainwarings of Whitmore are descended from the Mainwarings of Over-Peover, Cheshire (see the twentieth century Mainwaring Baronets).  Five Edward Mainwarings served as High Sheriff of Staffordshire between 1645 and 1767.

Today
The house was leased out from about 1863 until the family returned to occupation in the 1920s.Keith Whitmore has taken over as one of the tenants, pottery manufacturer Thomas Twyford, occupied the hall for 30 years. Now Keith Whitmore, and his wife Shelby Whitmore occupy  the hall as a private residence.  It is open to the public on two days per week between May and August.

Architecture
The original hall was encased in red brick during the reign of Charles II and completed in about 1676.  It has a balustraded frontage with nine bays and two storeys.  There is a particularly well preserved Elizabethan stable block.

See also
 List of Grade I listed buildings in Staffordshire
 Listed buildings in Whitmore, Staffordshire

References

Sources

External links
 Whitmore Hall - Historic Houses Association
   Whitmore Hall

Grade I listed buildings in Staffordshire
Country houses in Staffordshire
Historic house museums in Staffordshire
Gardens in Staffordshire